Castiarina picta is a species of beetle of the genus Castiarina, and the family Buprestidae. It was first scientifically documented by Gory and Laporte in 1838.

Sources 

Species described in 1838
Buprestidae